Travelogue is the second full-length studio album released by British synthpop group The Human League, released in May 1980. It was the last album with founding members Ian Craig Marsh and Martyn Ware, as they would leave to form Heaven 17 later that year.

Background
For Travelogue, the band worked with a new coproducer, Richard Manwaring, who went on to produce OMD's platinum-selling Architecture & Morality the following year.

"Tracks like 'The Black Hit of Space' are way ahead of their time," observed Martyn Ware. "Pumping the synths through massive distortion and overloading the desk. How prescient is that? The ethos of what we were doing was to kind of future-proof it all. We were envisaging people playing this music in ten or twenty years' time."

Travelogue entered the UK album chart at #16, which was also its peak, and remained on the chart for nine weeks in 1980 – a vast improvement on their debut album, Reproduction, which failed to chart at all the year before. However, that did not prevent the departure of founding members Ware  and Ian Craig Marsh, who went on to form Heaven 17. Remaining members Phil Oakey and Adrian Wright moved The Human League in a new direction with a new lineup. When they began to make a commercial impact the following year, Travelogue re-entered the chart in August 1981 for a further 33 weeks, and was certified Gold by the BPI in May 1982.

The sleeve repurposes a photo “Sunset Silhouettes Trapper and Dogs Crossing Saganagons Lake, Ontario”, which featured in a 1962 edition of the National Geographic magazine.

Singles
Two songs were released as singles from the album; a re-recorded version of the band's first single, "Being Boiled" (this time as part of the Holiday '80 EP released a month before the album), and a cover of Mick Ronson's "Only After Dark" (which was ultimately given away as a free single with a re-issue of the band's 1979 single "Empire State Human" in June 1980). Neither of these were successful ("Being Boiled" became a UK Top-10 hit in 1982, but it was a stereo remix of the old single version, not the Holiday '80/Travelogue version). The album also featured a cover of the famed advertising jingle for Gordon's Gin, written by Jeff Wayne.

Re-issues
Virgin Records remastered and re-issued Travelogue on CD in 1988, with an expanded track listing which included the Holiday '80 EP, the disco single "I Don't Depend on You" (originally released under the moniker "The Men"), and the single "Boys and Girls", which had been produced by Oakey and Wright after the line-up split.

The Canadian issue of Travelogue was released in a different sleeve, similar to the Holiday '80 front cover, and the track listing also differed: "The Voice of Buddha" (the re-recorded version of "Being Boiled" under a different name), "The Black Hit of Space", "Only After Dark", "Life Kills", "Dreams of Leaving" b/w "Crow and a Baby", "The Touchables", "Gordon's Gin", "Rock 'N' Roll"/"Night Clubbing", "WXJL Tonight". Similarly, the Australian issue also featured a different track listing, though the original sleeve and song titles were retained for this release:
"Being Boiled", "The Black Hit of Space", "Only After Dark", "Life Kills", "Dreams of Leaving" b/w "Crow and a Baby", "The Touchables", "Rock 'N' Roll", "Marianne" (alternate version), "Gordon's Gin", "WXJL Tonight".

In 2016 both Travelogue and its predecessor Reproduction were re-issued on 180g vinyl.

Legacy
In 2015 Travelogue was the subject of a BBC 6Music documentary as part of the "Sounds of a City" series. The programme examined the album's sound and how it grew out of the city, going on to influence a new generation of musicians. The documentary features interviews with Martyn Ware, Jarvis Cocker and Róisín Murphy, among others. – BBC6 Music, 27 December 2015.

Track listing

Personnel
The Human League
Philip Oakey – vocals, synthesizer
Ian Craig Marsh – vocals, synthesizer
Martyn Ware – vocals, synthesizer
Philip Adrian Wright – film technician

Charts

References

1980 albums
The Human League albums
Virgin Records albums